Gary George Hallberg (born May 31, 1958) is an American professional golfer who has played on the PGA Tour, Nationwide Tour, and Champions Tour.

Amateur career 
Hallberg was born in Berwyn, Illinois. He attended Wake Forest University in Winston-Salem, North Carolina and was a member of the golf team. He was a member of the 1977 Walker Cup team. In addition, Hallberg was the individual medalist at the 1979 NCAA Division I Men's Golf Championships. There were expectations that he would turn pro at this time. However, Hallberg asserted that he intended to return to Wake Forest for his senior year. Hallberg was the first four-time, first-team All-American in the history of intercollegiate golf. As of May 1979, Hallberg intended to try to qualify for the PGA Tour at Fall 1980 PGA Tour Qualifying School.

Professional career 
Hallberg was able to circumvent the PGA Tour Qualifying Tournament, however. He was the first player to obtain his PGA Tour card by winning a set level of money (in this case $8,000 in 1980) rather than by going to q-school.

Hallberg won three PGA Tour events during his career. He was PGA Tour Rookie of the Year in 1980. His best finish in major championships was a T-6 at both the 1984 PGA Championship and The Masters in 1985. At the 1991 Open Championship, Hallberg was tied for the lead after 36  holes before finishing T32. During his late forties, he played mostly on the Nationwide Tour, winning once.

Hallberg began playing on the Champions Tour in 2008 after turning 50. He won his first title in 2010 at the Ensure Classic at Rock Barn. He shot a final round of 11-under par 61 in the final round to come from behind and win by one over Fred Couples and by two over Bernhard Langer. The win made him the fourth player to win on all the PGA Tour sponsored tours (PGA Tour, Nationwide Tour, and Champions Tour).

Hallberg has also done some analyst work for CNBC and NBC Sports. He lives in Castle Rock, Colorado. Gary's son Eric is also a professional golfer who qualified for the PGA Tour's 2015 Frys.com Open, and has also qualified to play on the Korn Ferry Tour, PGA Tour Latinoamérica and PGA Tour Canada.

Amateur wins
1976 Western Junior
1978 North and South Amateur
1979 North and South Amateur, NCAA Division I Championship

Professional wins (12)

PGA Tour wins (3)

*Note: The 1992 Buick Southern Open was shortened to 54 holes due to rain.

PGA Tour playoff record (0–2)

Japan Golf Tour wins (1)

Buy.com Tour wins (1)

South American Golf Circuit wins (1)
1980 Argentine Open

Other wins (5)
1977 Illinois Open Championship (as an amateur)
1981 Lille Open (France)
1982 Illinois Open Championship
1986 Chrysler Team Championship (with Scott Hoch)
1988 Jerry Ford Invitational

Champions Tour wins (1)

Results in major championships

LA = low amateur
CUT = missed the half-way cut
"T" indicates a tie for a place

Summary

Most consecutive cuts made – 4 (1992 U.S. Open – 1993 PGA)
Longest streak of top-10s – 2 (1984 PGA – 1985 Masters)

Results in The Players Championship

CUT = missed the halfway cut
"T" indicates a tie for a place

U.S. national team appearances
Amateur
Walker Cup: 1977 (winners)

References

External links

American male golfers
Wake Forest Demon Deacons men's golfers
PGA Tour golfers
PGA Tour Champions golfers
Golf writers and broadcasters
Golfers from Illinois
Golfers from Colorado
People from Berwyn, Illinois
Sportspeople from the Chicago metropolitan area
People from Castle Rock, Colorado
1958 births
Living people